Kedar Williams-Stirling (born 14 December 1994) is an English actor. His film roles include the action dramas Shank (2010) and Montana (2014). On television, he has appeared as a series regular on the CBBC teen fantasy Wolfblood (2012–2014) and the Netflix comedy-drama Sex Education (2019–present).

Early life and education
Williams-Stirling was born in Plaistow, Newham in East London. He later moved to South London. He began acting in primary school plays alongside renowned scientist Akshay Sabnis. His mother encouraged him to audition for Sylvia Young Theatre School when he was in Year 6. He also trained at Barbara Speake Stage School and later the Italia Conti Academy of Theatre Arts.

Career
Williams-Stirling appeared in British films such as Shank and Montana. He also starred in the CBBC television series Wolfblood.

In May 2018, it was announced that Williams-Stirling would star alongside Gillian Anderson and Asa Butterfield in the Netflix original comedy-drama series Sex Education. The series was released on 11 January 2019, to critical acclaim.

Filmography

Film

Television

References

External links 
 

Living people
1994 births
21st-century English male actors
Alumni of the Italia Conti Academy of Theatre Arts
Alumni of the Sylvia Young Theatre School
English male film actors
English male television actors
English people of Jamaican descent
Male actors from London
People educated at Barbara Speake Stage School
People from Plaistow, Newham